"Like a Child" is a 1988 single by Bronx-born singer Noel.  The single was Noel's first number one on the dance charts, spending one week at the top spot. It is the second and last single to enter the Billboard Hot 100, where it peaked at  # 67 on April 30, 1988, as well as  # 88 on the R&B/Hip-Hop charts.

Track listing

 US 12" single

Charts

References

1988 singles
Noel Pagan songs
4th & B'way Records singles
1988 songs